The 1981 Northern Ireland Classic was a one-off invitational snooker tournament, held from 3 to 7 November 1981 at the Ulster Hall, Belfast, Northern Ireland. Jimmy White defeated Steve Davis by eleven to nine (11–9) in the final. Dennis Taylor made the highest  with 112.

Five of the top eight players in the rankings participated: Cliff Thorburn (1), Steve Davis (2), Terry Griffiths (3), Dennis Taylor (5) and Doug Mountjoy (6). Also participating were Kirk Stevens (10), Alex Higgins (11), and Jimmy White (21).

Prize fund
The prize fund is shown below:
 Winner: £5,000
 Final: £3,500
 Semi-final: £2,500
 Quarter-final: £1,500

Main draw

Final

References 

Northern Ireland Trophy
Northern Ireland Classic
Classic
Northern Ireland Classic